Nadia Marcinko, also known as Nada Marcinkova (born 1986), is a Slovakian-born pilot, flight instructor, and the CEO of Aviloop, an aviation website.  She is known for being a co-conspirator of financier and registered sex offender Jeffrey Epstein, as well as Ghislaine Maxwell.

Career

In multiple sources, references are made by Marcinko herself, to being a model, particularly in her teen years. However, it is not clear whether her references to modeling are about her early life in Europe or the period after she came to the United States.  She describes her transition from modeling to becoming a pilot by saying she was "ready for longer runways" and went from "runway to runway".

In August 2019, Business Insider reported that depositions taken in relation to the Epstein case disputed that she had been a model. Other sources also dispute her modeling background.

Marcinko started flight training at a flight school at the Palm Beach County Florida Airport, and with 250 hours in her logbook, she accepted an offer from Jeffrey Epstein to obtain her Gulfstream II rating and was certified shortly thereafter.  , she held three rating certificates: for single-engine aircraft, multi-engine aircraft, and various Gulfstream business jets (have individual certificates).

Marcinko became known on social media, under her label "Gulfstream Girl". Gulfstream Aerospace filed a trademark infringement suit (Gulfstream Aerospace Corporation v. Aviloop LLC et al.) against her on November 18, 2013. Marcinko and Gulfstream reached an out-of-court settlement, filed on January 6, 2014, after which Marcinko changed her online name to "Global Girl".

, she remained CEO of her aviation business, Aviloop, described by Wired as a "supremely odd aviation branding business, whose website features flawless shots of her with Gulfstreams."  The business is based at an address in New York, that is in a property controlled by Mark Epstein, brother of Jeffrey Epstein.

Association with Jeffrey Epstein

Over the years, several news outlets have reported that Marcinko, previously known under the name of Nada Marcinkova, worked as a long-term assistant to Jeffrey Epstein and was a regular pilot of Epstein's so-called Lolita Express. It was reported that she was one of four of Epstein's accomplices (including Sarah Kellen, Adriana Ross, and Lesley Groff) that were given immunity from prosecution in Epstein's non-prosecution agreement from 2008 which saw him serve a sentence of just over a year. The Guardian reported that Marcinkova was questioned in 2010 concerning Epstein, who was convicted of soliciting an underage girl for prostitution.

In 2015, The Daily Telegraph reported that Marcinko, during questioning regarding alleged underaged sexual activities had "invoked her right not to incriminate herself, protected by the US constitution's Fifth Amendment, when she was asked about the Duke of York", who was a frequent guest of Epstein.

According to the Miami Herald, Marcinko visited Epstein "more than 70 times when he was in Palm Beach custody," after his first criminal conviction.

In 2019, in written testimony given by Epstein's underage victims, Marcinko is also described as having encouraged and engaged in sexual acts with the underaged girls, sometimes involving sex toys, at the suggestion of Epstein.  In one account, according to police, Epstein told one victim Marcinkova was his "sex slave", and that Epstein had "purchased her" when she was 15 from her family in the former Yugoslavia, a claim journalist Philip Weiss had made in New York Magazine in 2007.

In September 2019, CNN stated that Marcinko could be considered as a "victim" of Epstein, rather than an "accomplice".  CNN quoted Marcinko's lawyers who said: "Like other victims, Nadia Marcinko is and has been severely traumatized", and that "She needs time to process and make sense of what she has been through before she is able to speak out".

Personal life 
She was born Nada Marcinkova in eastern Czechoslovakia (now Slovakia).  Her father, Peter Marcinko, is an architect from Prešov, Slovakia.

It was incorrectly reported that Marcinkova was from Yugoslavia.  According to her father, she was not brought as a young girl to the U.S. to live with Epstein. After leaving Epstein, she changed her name to Nadia Marcinko.

See also
 Ghislaine Maxwell
 Julie K. Brown
 Virginia Roberts Giuffre

References

External links
 AVILOOP Commercial flying website

Living people
1980s births
People from Košice
Slovak emigrants to the United States
Women aviators
Jeffrey Epstein